Yemenite Hebrew ( ʿĪvrīṯ Tēmŏnīṯ), also referred to as Temani Hebrew, is the pronunciation system for Hebrew traditionally used by Yemenite Jews. Yemenite Hebrew has been studied by language scholars, many of whom believe it to retain older phonetic and grammatical features lost elsewhere. Yemenite speakers of Hebrew have garnered considerable praise from language purists because of their use of grammatical features from classical Hebrew. Tunisian rabbi and scholar, Rabbi Meir Mazuz, once said of Yemenites that they are good grammarians.

It is believed by some scholars that its phonology was heavily influenced by spoken Yemeni Arabic. Other scholars and rabbis, including Rabbi Yosef Qafih and Rabbi Abraham Isaac Kook, hold the view that Yemenite Hebrew was not influenced by Yemenite Arabic, as this type of Arabic was also spoken by Yemenite Jews and is distinct from the liturgical Hebrew and the conversational Hebrew of the communities. Among other things, Rabbi Qafih notes that the Yemenite Jews spoke Arabic with a distinct Jewish flavor, inclusive of pronouncing many Arabic words with vowels foreign to the Arabic language, e.g., the Qamats and Tseri. He argues that the pronunciation of Yemenite Hebrew was not only uninfluenced by Arabic, but it influenced the pronunciation of Arabic by those Jews, despite the Jewish presence in Yemen for over a millennium.

History
Yemenite Hebrew may have been derived from, or influenced by, the Hebrew of the Geonic era Babylonian Jews: the oldest Yemenite manuscripts use the Babylonian system of vowel symbols, which is believed to antedate the Tiberian vowel system. As late as 937 CE, Qirqisāni wrote: “The biblical readings which are wide-spread in Yemen are in the Babylonian tradition." Indeed, in many respects, such as the assimilation of paṯaḥ and səġūl, the current Yemenite pronunciation fits the Babylonian notation better than the Tiberian (though the Babylonian notation does not reflect the approximation between holam and sere in some Yemenite dialects). This is because in the Babylonian tradition of vocalization there is no distinct symbol for the səġūl. It does not follow, as claimed by some scholars, that the pronunciation of the two communities was identical, any more than the pronunciation of Sephardim and Ashkenazim is the same because both use the Tiberian symbols. 

The following chart shows the seven vowel paradigms found in the Babylonian supralinear punctuation, which are reflected to this day by the Yemenite pronunciation of Biblical lections and liturgies, though they now use the Tiberian symbols. For example, there is no separate symbol for the Tiberian səġūl and the pataḥ and amongst Yemenites they have the same phonetic sound. In this connection, the Babylonian vowel signs remained in use in Yemen long after the Babylonian Biblical tradition had been abandoned, almost until our own time.

Distinguishing features
The following chart shows the phonetic values of the Hebrew letters in the Yemenite Hebrew pronunciation tradition.

Among the Yemenites, they have preserved the sounds for each of the six double-sounding consonants: bəged-kəfet. The following are examples of their peculiar way of pronunciation of these and other letters:
The phoneme gímel/ğimal with the dāḡēš/dageš is pronounced in the Yemenite Jewish tradition as the English "j" in the word "Jack". Thus, the verse  (Deut. 4:8) is realized as, u'mi, ğoi ğaḏol (as in Sanʽani Arabic  ğīm /d͡ʒ/ but unlike Taʽizzi-Adeni Arabic /g/).
gímel/gimal without dāḡēš/dageš is pronounced   like Arabic ġayn.
dāleṯ/dal without dāḡēš/dageš is pronounced   as the "th" in "this". Thus, the word  ("one") in Shema Yisrael is always pronounced aḥāḏ.
Thus, Sabbath day is pronounced in Yemenite Hebrew, Yom ha-Shabboth.
Emphatic and guttural letters have nearly the same sounds and are produced from deep in the throat, as in Arabic.
The voiceless pharyngeal fricative of ḥêṯ/ħet is equivalent to the Arabic character ح , with a slight aspirated sound but never like the "ch" in Bach.
The phoneme ʻáyin/зajin is identical to the Arabic  , and is a voiced pharyngeal fricative. (The Sephardic pronunciation of ע, however, is of a weaker nature).
The Hebrew tsadi is not a voiceless alveolar sibilant affricate "ts" among the Yemenites, but rather a deep-sounding "s" (pharyngealized fricative). 
The Hebrew phoneme /q/ (qof) is pronounced by the Yemenites (other than the Jews from Shar'ab) as a voiced /g/, as in "go," (as in Sanʽani Arabic  gāf /g/ but unlike unlike Taʽizzi-Adeni Arabic /q/) and is in keeping with their tradition (assuming it to be correct) that a different phonetic sound is given for gímel/gimal (see supra).
The phoneme resh, or what is also known as the Hebrew rhotic consonant /r/, is pronounced in Yemenite Jewish tradition as an alveolar trill, rather than the uvular trill [ʀ], and is identical to Arabic   and follows the conventions of old Hebrew. 
The kaf sofit with a dot / dagesh is pronounced as such, as in the rare example of the last word in Psalm 30.

Vowels
Qāmaṣ gāḏôl/Qamac qadol is pronounced , as in Ashkenazi Hebrew and Tiberian Hebrew. The Yemenite pronunciation for Qamats gadol and Qamats qatan is identical (see infra.).
There is no distinction between the vowels paṯaḥ/pataħ and səḡôl/segol all being pronounced , like the Arabic fatḥa (a feature also found in old Babylonian Hebrew, which used a single symbol for all three). A šəwâ nāʻ/šwa naз, however, is identical to a חטף פתח and חטף סגול.
Final hê/hej with mappîq/mefiq (a dot in the centre) has an aspirated sound, generally stronger sounding than the regular hê/hej. Aleph (אַלַף) with a dagesh (a dot), a rare occurrence, is pronounced with a glottal stop, e.g., the word וַיָּבִיאּוּ in Genesis 43:26. Conversely, some words in Hebrew which are written with the final hê ending (without the mappîq) are realized by a secondary glottal stop and so are abruptly cut short, as to hold one's breath.
A semivocalic sound is heard before paṯaḥ gānûḇ/pataħ ganuv (paṯaḥ coming between a long vowel and a final guttural): thus ruaħ (spirit) sounds like rúwwaḥ and siaħ (speech) sounds like síyyaḥ. (That is shared with other Mizrahi pronunciations, such as the Syrian.)

Yemenite pronunciation is not uniform, and Morag has distinguished five sub-dialects, the best known being probably Sana'ani, originally spoken by Jews in and around Sana'a. Roughly, the points of difference are as follows:
In some dialects, ḥōlem/ħolam (long "o" in modern Hebrew) is pronounced  (anywhere from non-rhotic English "er" to German o-umlaut), but in others, it is pronounced  like ṣêrệ/cerej. (The last pronunciation is shared with Lithuanian Jews.)
Some dialects (e.g. Sharab) do not differentiate between bêṯ/bet with dāḡēš/dageš and without it. That occurs most of Mizrahi Hebrew.
Sana'ani Hebrew primarily places stress on the penultimate syllable, as in Ashkenazi Hebrew.

Qamats Gadol and Qamats Qatan
The Yemenites in their reading practices continue the orthographic conventions of the early grammarians, such as Abraham ibn Ezra and Aaron Ben-Asher. One basic rule of grammar states that every word with a long vowel sound, that is, one of either five vowel sounds whose mnemonics are "pītūḥe ḥöthom" (i.e. ḥiraq, šūraq, ṣeré, ḥölam and qamaṣ), whenever there is written beside one of these long vowel sounds a meteg (or what is also called a ga’ayah) and is denoted by a small vertical line below the word (such as shown here זָכְרוּ), it indicates that the vowel (in that case, qamaṣ) must be drawn out with a prolonged sound. For example, ōōōōōō, instead of ō, (e.g. zoː— khǝ ru). In the Sephardic tradition, however, the practice is different altogether, and they will also alter the phonetic sound of the long vowel qamaṣ whenever the vowel appears alongside a meteg (a small vertical line), giving to it the sound of "a", as in cat, instead of "ōōōōō."

For example:  = šoː mǝ ru,  = ye rǝ du,  = ye dǝ ‘u,  = ʔö mǝ rim,  = šö mǝ rim,  = sī sǝ ra,  = šū vǝ kha, and  = tū vǝ kha.

The Qamats qatan is realized as the non-extended "o"-sound in the first qamats (qamaṣ) in the word, חָכְמָה ⇒ ḥokhma (wisdom).

The Yemenite qamaṣ , represented in the transliterated texts by the diaphoneme , is pronounced as the English "a"-sound in "all" or as in "halt", or "caught," and this phoneme is always the same, whether for a long or short vowel, but the long vowel sound is always prolonged.

Holam and sere
A distinct feature of Yemenite Hebrew is that there is some degree of approximation between the ḥōlam and the ṣêrệ. To the untrained ear, they may sound as the same phoneme, but Yemenite grammarians will point out the difference. The feature varies by dialect:

For example, the word "shalom", is pronounced sholøm, the  having the phonetic sound of something between a non-rhotic English "er" and the German ö. For all practical purposes, the sound is similar to the "i" in girl.
In some provincial dialects, in particular that of Aden, holam becomes a long e and is indeed indistinguishable from sere, and some early manuscripts sometimes confuse or interchange the symbols for the two sounds.

Some see the assimilation of the two vowels as a local variant within the wider Babylonian family, which the Yemenites happened to follow.

Strict application of Mobile Shewā 
Rabbi Abraham Isaac Kook and Rabbi Jacob Saphir have praised the Yemenites in their correct pronunciation of Hebrew. They still read the biblical lections and liturgies according to what is prescribed for Hebrew grammar and are meticulous to pronounce the mobile šĕwā  in each of its changing forms.

Aharon Ben-Asher, in his treatise on the proper usage of Hebrew vowels and trope symbols, writes on the šĕwā: "[It is] the servant of all the letters in the entire Scriptures, whether at the beginning of the word, or in the middle of the word, or at the end of the word; whether what is pronounced by the tongue or not pronounced, for it has many ways… However, if it is joined with one of four [guttural] letters, א ח ה ע, its manner [of pronunciation] will be like the manner of the vowel of the second letter in that word, such as:  (Jud. 1:7) = böhonoth;  (Prov. 1:22) = te’ehavu;  (Ps. 10:8) = leḥeləkhah;  (Ezra 2:2) = reʻeloyoh." 

On the mobile šĕwā and its usage amongst Yemenite Jews, Israeli grammarian Shelomo Morag wrote: "The pronunciation of the šĕwā mobile preceding א, ה, ח, ע, or ר in the Yemenite tradition is realized in accordance with the vowel following the guttural; quantitatively, however, this is an ultra-short vowel. A šĕwā preceding a yōḏ is pronounced as an ultra-short ḥīreq: the word  is pronounced biyōm. This is the way the šĕwā is known to have been pronounced in the Tiberian tradition."

Other examples of words of the mobile šĕwā in the same word taking the phonetic sound of the vowel assigned to the adjacent guttural letter or of a mobile šĕwā before the letter yod (י) taking the phonetic sound of the yod, can be seen in the following: 
(Gen. 48:21)  = weheshiv
(Gen. 49:30)  = bamoʻoroh
(Gen. 50:10)  = beʻevar
(Exo. 7:27)  = wi’im
(Exo. 20:23)  = mizbiḥī
(Deut. 11:13)  = wohoyoh
(Psalm 92:1-3)

(vs. 1) liyöm -- (vs. 2) lohödöth -- (vs. 3) lahağīd

The above rule applies only to when one of the four guttural letters (אחהע), or a yod (י) or a resh (ר) follows the mobile šĕwā, but it does not apply to the other letters; then, the mobile šĕwā is always read as a short-sounding pataḥ.

Distinctive pronunciations preserved 
Geographically isolated for centuries, the Yemenite Jews constituted a peculiar phenomenon within Diaspora Jewry. In their isolation, they preserved specific traditions of both Hebrew and Aramaic. The traditions, transmitted from generation to generation through the teaching and reciting of the Bible, post-biblical Hebrew literature (primarily the Mishnah), the Aramaic Targums of the Bible, and the Babylonian Talmud, are still alive. They are manifest in the traditional manner of reading Hebrew that is practised by most members of the community. The Yemenite reading traditions of the Bible are now based on the Tiberian text and vocalization, as proofread by the masorete, Aaron ben Asher, with the one exception that the vowel sǝġūl is pronounced as a pataḥ, since the sǝġūl did not exist in the Babylonian orthographic tradition to which the Jews of Yemen had previously been accustomed. In what concerns Biblical orthography, with the one exception of the sǝgūl, the Yemenite Jewish community does not differ from any other Jewish community.

Although the vast majority of post-Biblical Hebrew and Aramaic words are pronounced the same way or nearly the same way by all of Israel's diverse ethnic groups, including the Jews of Yemen, there are still other words whose phonemic system differs greatly from the way it is used in Modern Hebrew, the sense here being the tradition of vocalization or diction of selective Hebrew words found in the Mishnah and Midrashic literature, or of Aramaic words found in the Talmud, and which tradition has been meticulously preserved by the Jews of Yemen. Two of the more recognized Yemenite pronunciations are for the words רבי and גברא, the first pronounced as Ribbi, instead of Rabbi (as in Rabbi Meir), and the second pronounced guvra, instead of gavra. In the first case, archaeologist Benjamin Mazar was the first to discover its linguistic usage in the funerary epigrams of the 3rd and 4th-century CE, during excavations at the catacombs in Beit She'arim (Roman-era Jewish village). Nahman Avigad, speaking of the same, wrote: "Of special interest is the title Rabbi and its Greek transliteration. In the inscriptions of Beth She'arim found in the former seasons ריבי and ביריבי are usual, and only once do we find רבי, which has been regarded as a defective form of ריבי, for in Greek we generally find the form. The transliteration found here shows that the title was pronounced in Palestine in different ways, sometimes Rabbi (ΡΑΒΒΙ, ΡΑΒΙ), sometimes Ribbi (ΡΙΒΒΙ, ΡΙΒΙ) and occasionally even Rebbi (ΒΗΡΕΒΙ)." In the latter case, the Jerusalem Talmud occasionally brings down the word גברא in plene scriptum, גוברייא (pl. for גברא), showing that its pronunciation was the same as that in use by the Yemenites. Some have raised the proposition that the Yemenite linguistic tradition dates back to the Amoraim.

R. Yehudai Gaon, in his Halakhot Pesukot (Hil. Berakhot), uses yod as the mater lectionis to show the vowel hiriq, after the qoph (ק) in Qiryat Shema. The editor of the critical edition, A. Israel, who places its composition in Babylonia, notes that "linguists would take an interest" in Yehudai Gaon's variant spellings of words, where especially the matres lectionis is used in place of vowels, "represented either by a plene  alef (א), waw (ו), and yod (י)." The use of the matres lectionis in place of the vowel hiriq in the construct case of the words קִרְיַת  שְׁמַע ("recital of Shemaʻ" = קירית שמע) reflects apparently the Babylonian tradition of pronunciation, and, today, the same tradition is mirrored in the Yemenite pronunciation of Qiryat shemaʻ.

The following diagrams show a few of the more conspicuous differences in the Yemenite tradition of vocalization and which Israeli linguist, Shelomo Morag, believes reflects an ancient form of vocalizing the texts and was once known and used by all Hebrew-speakers.

Notes on transliteration: In the Yemenite Jewish tradition, the vowel qamaṣ , represents . The Hebrew character Tau, without a dot of accentuation, represents . The Hebrew character Gimal, with a dot of accentuation, represents .

In the Yemenite tradition, the plural endings on the words זָכִיּוֹת (merits), מַלְכִיּוֹת (kingdoms), גָּלִיּוֹת (exiles), טעִיּוֹת (errors), טרפִיּוֹת (defective animals) and עֵדִיּוֹת (testimonies), all differ from the way they are vocalized in Modern Hebrew. In Modern Hebrew, these words are marked with a shuraq, as follows:  זָכֻיּוֹת - מַלְכֻיּוֹת - גָּלֻיּוֹת - טעֻיּוֹת - טרפֻיּוֹת - עֵדֻיּוֹת. Although the word  (kingdoms) in Daniel 8:22 is vocalized malkhuyoth, as it is in Modern Hebrew, Shelomo Morag thinks that the Yemenite tradition reflects a phonological phenomenon known as dissimilation, whereby similar consonants or vowels in a word become less similar. Others explain the discrepancy as being in accordance with a general rule of practice, prevalent in the 2nd century CE, where the Hebrew in rabbinic literature was distinguished from that of Biblical Hebrew, and put into an entire class and category of its own, with its own rules of vocalization (see infra).

The Hebrew noun חֲתִיכָּה (ḥăṯīkkah), in the upper left column, is a word meaning "slice/piece" (in the absolute state), or חֲתִיכַּת בשר ("piece of meat") in the construct state. The noun is of the same metre as קְלִיפָּה (qǝlipah), a word meaning "peel," or the "rind" of a fruit. Both the kaph and pe in these nouns are with a dagesh. However, the same roots applied to different meters, serving as gerunds, as in "slicing/cutting" [meat] and "peeling" [an apple], the words would respectively be חֲתִיכָה (ḥăṯīḫah) and קליפָה (qǝlīfah), without a dagesh in the Hebrew characters Kaph and Pe (i.e. rafe letters), such as when the verb is used with the preposition "after": e.g. "after peeling the apple" = אחרי קליפת התפוח, or "after cutting the meat" = אחרי חתיכת הבשר.

In the Talmud (Ḥullin 137b; Avodah Zarah 58b), the Sages of Israel had a practice to read words derived from the Scriptures in their own given way, while the same words derived from the Talmud or in other exegetical literature (known as the Midrash) in a different way: "When Isse the son of Hinei went up [there], he found Rabbi Yoḥanan teaching [a certain Mishnah] to the creations, saying, raḥelim (i.e. רחלים = the Hebrew word for "ewes"), etc. He said to him, 'Teach it [by its Mishnaic name = רחלות], raḥeloth!' He replied, '[What I say is] as it is written [in the Scriptures]: Ewes (raḥelim), two-hundred.' (Gen. 32:15) He answered him, 'The language of the Torah is by itself, and the language employed by the Sages is by itself!'" (לשון תורה לעצמה, לשון חכמים לעצמן).

Others, however, say that these anomalies reflect a tradition that antedates the Tiberian Masoretic texts.

The use of the phoneme "ṣerê", represented by the two dots "◌ֵ", instead of "pataḥ-səġūl" ( ֶ )  for the word "Yavneh" may have been influenced by the Palestinian dialect spoken in the Land of Israel in the 1st-century CE. 

In Yemenite tradition, many words in both Biblical and Mishnaic Hebrew which are written with the final hê ending (without the mappîq) are realized by a secondary glottal stop, meaning, they are abruptly cut short, as when one holds his breath. Shelomo Morag who treats upon this peculiarity in the Yemenite tradition of vocalization brings down two examples from the Book of Isaiah, although by no means exclusive, where he shows the transliteration for the words תִּפָּדֶה in Isaiah 1:27 and וְנֵלְכָה in Isaiah 2:5, and both of which represent , as in tippoːdä(ʔ) and wǝnelăχoː(ʔ) respectively. The word פָרָשָׁה (Bible Codex) in the upper-middle column is pronounced in the same way, e.g. frsh.

The Hebrew preposition is always written with the noun, joined together as one word, and the lamed is always accentuated with a dagesh. For example, if the noun, מלך ⇒ king, would normally have been written with the definite article "the," as in הַמֶּלֶךְ ⇒ the king, and the noun was to show possession, as in the sentence: "the palace of the king," the definite article "the" (Hebrew: ה) is dropped, but the same vowel pataḥ of the definite article is carried over to the lamed, as in שֶׁלַּמֶּלֶךְ, instead of של המלך. The vowel on the lamed will sometimes differ, depending on what noun comes after the preposition. For example, the definite article "the" in Hebrew nouns which begin with aleph or resh and sometimes ayin, such as in הָאָדָם and in הָרִאשׁוֹן, or in הָעוֹלָם, is written with the vowel qamaṣ – in which case, the vowel qamaṣ is carried over to the lamed, as in שֶׁלָּאָדָם and in שֶׁלָּרִאשׁוֹן and in שֶׁלָּעוֹלָם. Another general rule is that whenever a possessive noun is written without the definite article "the", as in the words, "a king's sceptre," or "the sceptre of a king" (Heb. מלך), the lamed in the preposition is written with the vowel shǝwa (i.e. mobile shǝwa), as in שרביט שֶׁלְּמֶּלֶךְ, and as in, "if it belongs to Israel" ⇒ אם הוא שֶׁלְּיִשְׂרַאֵל. Whenever the noun begins with a shǝwa, as in the proper noun Solomon (Heb. שְׁלֹמֹה) and one wanted to show possession, the lamed in the preposition is written with a ḥiraq, as in (Song of Solomon 3:7): מטתו שֶׁלִּשְׁלֹמֹה ⇒ "Solomon's bed", or as in עונשם שֶׁלִּרְשָׁעִים ⇒ "the punishment of the wicked", or in חבילה שֶׁלִּתְרוּמָה ⇒ "a bundle of heave-offering."

Another rule of practice in Hebrew grammar is that two shǝwas חְ are never written one after the other at the beginning of any word; neither can two ḥaṭaf pataḥs חֲ or two ḥaṭaf sǝġūls חֱ be written at the beginning of a word one after the other. The practical implication arising from this rule is that when there is a noun beginning with a ḥaṭaf pataḥ, as in the word, חֲבִרְתָּהּ ⇒ “her companion”, and one wishes to add thereto the preposition “to” – as in, “to her companion” ⇒ לַחֲבִרְתָּהּ, the lamed is written with the vowel pataḥ, instead of a shǝwa (i.e. a mobile shǝwa), seeing that the shǝwa at the beginning of a word and the ḥaṭaf pataḥ, as well as the ḥaṭaf sǝġūl, are all actually one and the same vowel (in the Babylonian tradition), and it is as though he had written two shǝwas one after the other. Likewise, in the possessive case, “belonging to her companion” ⇒ שֶׁלַּחֲבִרְתָּהּ, the lamed in the preposition של is written with the vowel pataḥ.

Hebrew vernacular 
The Leiden MS. of the Jerusalem Talmud is important in that it preserves some earlier variants to textual readings of that Talmud, such as in Tractate Pesaḥim 10:3 (70a), which brings down the old Palestinian-Hebrew word for charoseth (the sweet relish eaten at Passover), viz. dūkeh, instead of rūbeh/rabah, saying with a play on words: “The members of Isse's household would say in the name of Isse: Why is it called dūkeh? It is because she pounds [the spiced ingredients] with him.” The Hebrew word for "pound" is dakh, which rules out the spelling of " rabah ", as found in the printed editions. Today, the Jews of Yemen, in their vernacular of Hebrew, still call the charoseth by the name dūkeh.

Other quintessential Hebrew words which have been preserved by the Jews of Yemen is their manner of calling a receipt of purchase by the name, roy, rather than the word " qabbalah " that is now used in Modern Hebrew. The weekly biblical lection read on Sabbath days is called by the name seder, since the word parashah has a completely different meaning, denoting a Bible Codex containing the first Five Books of Moses (plural: codices = פרשיות).

Charity; alms (miṣwoː), so-called in Yemenite Jewish parlance, was usually in the form of bread, collected in baskets each Friday before the Sabbath by those appointed over this task for distribution among the needy, without them being brought to shame. The same word is often used throughout the Jerusalem Talmud, as well as in Midrashic literature, to signify what is given out to the poor and needy. Today, in Modern Hebrew, the word is seldom used to imply charity, replaced now by the word, ts’dakah (Heb. צְדָקָה). In contrast, the word צדקה amongst Jews in Sana’a was a tax levied upon Jewish householders, particularly those whose professions were butchers, and which tax consisted of hides and suet from butchered animals, and which things were sold on a daily basis by the Treasurer, and the money accruing from the sale committed to the public fund for the Jewish poor of the city, which money was distributed to the city's poor twice a year; once on Passover, and once on Sukkot. The fund itself was known by the name tḏer, lit. "the constant [revenues]."

Although Jews in Yemen widely made-use of the South-Arabic word mukhwāṭ for the “metal pointer” (stylus) used in pointing at the letters of sacred writ, they also knew the old Hebrew word for the same, which they called makhtev. The following story is related about this instrument in Midrash Rabba: “Rabban [Shimon] Gamliel says: ‘Five-hundred schools were in Beter, while the smallest of them wasn’t less than three-hundred children. They used to say, ‘If the enemy should ever come upon us, with these metal pointers we’ll go out against them and stab them!’...”

In other peculiar words of interest, they made use of the word, shilṭön, for “governor” or “king,” instead of “government,” the latter word now being the more common usage in Modern Hebrew; kothev, for “scrivener”, or copyist of religious texts, instead of the word “sofer” (scribe); ṣibbūr, for "a quorum of at least ten adult males," a word used in Yemen instead of the Modern Hebrew word, minyan; ḥefeṣ, a noun meaning “desirable thing,” was used by them to describe any “book” (especially one of a prophylactic nature), although now in Modern Hebrew it means “object”; fiqfūq had the connotation of “shock,” “violent agitation,” or “shaking-up,” although today, in Modern Hebrew, it has the meaning of “doubt” or “skepticism”; the word, harpathqe, was used to describe “great hardships,” although in Modern Hebrew the word has come to mean “adventures.” The word fazmūn, any happy liturgical poem, such as those sung on Simhat Torah, differs from today's Modern Hebrew word, pizmon, meaning, a “chorus” to a song. Another peculiar aspect of Yemenite Hebrew is what concerns denominative verbs. One of the nouns used for bread (made of wheat) is himmuṣ, derived from the blessing that is said whenever breaking bread, [המוציא [לחם מן הארץ = He that brings forth [bread from the earth]. Whenever they wanted to say its imperative form, “break bread!”, they made use of the denominative verb hammeṣ!. Similarly, the noun for the Third Sabbath meal was qiyyūm, literally meaning “observance,” in which they made use of the denominative verb, tǝqayyem = Will you eat with us (the Third Sabbath meal)?, or, נְקַיֵּם = Let us eat (the Third Sabbath meal), or, qiyam = He ate (the Third Sabbath meal).

See also 
 Yemenite Jewish poetry

References

Bibliography

  
 (Cited in article by Yehuda Ratzaby who quotes from Kitāb al-Ānwār, ed. Leon Nemoy) 
 

 (Hebrew)
 (Hebrew)
 (Hebrew)
 (Hebrew)
 (German)
 (Hebrew)

Further reading 
S. Morag, 'Pronunciations of Hebrew', Encyclopaedia Judaica XIII, 1120–1145

Yeivin, I., The Hebrew Language Tradition as Reflected in the Babylonian Vocalization: Jerusalem 1985 (Hebrew)
מלמדי תינוקות ודרכי הלימוד (Hebrew), beginning on page 50 in Halichoth Teiman (1963).
נקוד, טעמים ומסורת בתימן (Hebrew) in Rabbi Yosef Qafih's Collected Papers, volume 2, pages 931-936.
אלף בי (Hebrew): A popular Yemenite alaph bei book.
השירה והלחנים בתפילת יהודי תימן (Hebrew) in Rabbi Yosef Qafih's Collected Papers, volume 2, pages 958-960.

External links 
Sifra in the Babylonian supraliner punctuation, Manuscript: Vaticani ebraici 66 (Late 9th-mid 10th century)  
Pronunciation Chart, Pronunciation Chart (continued)
Torah reading with Targum Onkelos, read by Yemenite elder, Mori Shalom Cohen
Aleph be recording (published by http://www.temoni.org/?p=3652).
Aharon Amram - Recordings:
Tunes of Yemen - Aharon Amram for Android (discography from CDs at http://www.aharonamram.com/).
Cantillation of שביעי in Parshat Miketz (published by Nosach Teiman).
Reading of Psalm 119 (published by Nosach Teiman).
Yemenite reading of the complete Hallel (published by Nosach Teiman).
Piyyutim for Simchat Torah disc 1.
Megillat Eichah (portions thereof published by Nosach Teiman):
Chapter 2
Chapter 4
Chapter 5
Purim song: שמח דודי ביום פורים (published by Nosach Teiman).
1988 Selichot in a Rosh HaAyin synagogue
שבח אשיר
Rabbi Yosef 'Amar - Recordings and Work:
הקלטת וידאו משנת תשכ"ו - אופן טעמי המקרא, וכן קטעי הדגמה לאופן הקריאה בתורה (published by Nosach Teiman).
דוגמה לקריאות מהתנ"ך
קטע ממסכת ברכות
קטע ממסכת כלים
 Babylonian Talmud vowelized according to the tradition of the Jews of Yemen
הקדמה, סימני הניקוד, מבוא, מסורת תימן של לשון התלמוד ועוד
כל מסכת מגילה מתוך התלמוד הבבלי בניקוד תימני להורדה (from Nosach Teiman)
מסכת מכות - פרק ראשון מתוך התלמוד הבבלי בניקוד תימני להורדה (from Nosach Teiman)
Rabbi Yosef Qafih: Megillat Esther reading of Purim 1996 (until 2:5, from CD)
Rabbi Ratson 'Arusi - Recordings:
סעודת מצווה חתן וכלה בנוסח יהודי תימן
קינון והספד תימני
Ashmuroth in 1975 - Shabbazi Synagogue, Kiryat Ono (preceded by his introductory remarks)
ברכת חמה
גמרא בצוותא עם חברי כולל יום השישי
Vocabulary of Yemenite Pronunciations, David Ben-Abraham, 2005
On the Hebrew Language of Yemen, 2005 (mostly unreferenced)
Rabbi Evin Sapir's Account of Yemenite Hebrew (in Hebrew); free translation at http://www.chayas.com/evinsapir.doc
Vocalization of Hebrew Alphabet: A non-Yemenite's efforts at imitation of Sana'ani Yemenite Pronunciation of Hebrew.

Hebrew
Hebrew
Languages of Israel
Hebrew